Blaxland is a town in the Blue Mountains of New South Wales, Australia. Blaxland is located 65 kilometres west of Sydney in the local government area of the City of Blue Mountains. It is at an altitude of 234 metres and borders the townships of Glenbrook, Mount Riverview and Warrimoo.

History
Blaxland is named for Gregory Blaxland who along with William Lawson and William Wentworth, led the exploration that discovered a route over the Blue Mountains in 1813. Prior to 1879 the area was known as Wascoe.

The Pilgrim Inn was built c. 1825. It was a significant element in the area for some time, but eventually decayed. The remains, which are now adjacent to McDonald's, are heritage-listed.

The Rev. Joshua Hargrave became a major presence in the area in the early 20th. century, and a significant force in the growth of Blaxland as a village, especially South Blaxland. He built the first church in the area and, with his family and the Calver family, is associated with four homes that still survive: Tanfield in Hope Street, Menahne in Hope Street, Rosedale in View Street and Nardi in View Street. The homes are all heritage-listed.

Heritage listings 
Blaxland has a number of heritage listed sites, including:
 Blue Mountains National Park: Blue Mountains walking tracks

Population
According to the 2016 census of Population, there were 7,451 people in Blaxland.
 Aboriginal and Torres Strait Islander people made up 2.0% of the population. 
 82.2% of people were born in Australia. The next most common country of birth was England at 5.0%.   
 92.1% of people spoke only English at home. 
 The most common responses for religion were No Religion 30.2%, Catholic 22.7% and Anglican 19.0%.

Transport
Blaxland railway station is on the Blue Mountains Line of the NSW TrainLink intercity network. It is a disability-accessible station.

Commercial area
The village of Blaxland received a major overhaul in 2001 with the widening of the Great Western Highway. This work included the controversial planting of Canary Island Palm trees along the highway, but also created space for more shops and led to many refurbishments. These changes, combined with the upgrade of Blaxland Station, have improved business in Blaxland.

Blaxland also has a small industrial estate and the only remaining land fill waste facility in the Blue Mountains.

Services
 Blue Mountains Library branch, Hope Street
 Blaxland Rural Fire Brigade falls under the jurisdiction of the statewide Rural Fire Service

Schools
 Blaxland High School
 Blaxland East Public School
 Blaxland Public School

Sport and Recreation

Bushwalking Tracks 

Blaxland includes the Florabella Pass and Pippas Pass tracks. The Lennox Bridge (Lapstone Hill) and Knapsack Viaduct could be approached via Mitchell's Pass, but do further investigation if planning to hike some or all of the way there.

Blaxland Redbacks Soccer and Netball Clubs 
It is home to the Blaxland Redbacks soccer and netball teams.

The Soccer team was established in 1965 and resides at the home ground of St. Johns Oval, Blaxland. St. Johns Oval was named after the local St. Johns Ambulance Brigade who original donated the land for the soccer fields to the club.

Wascoe Siding Miniature Railway 
The Wascoe Siding is a Miniature Railway was established in 1964 by John Green. It is a conversion of a disused railway cutting from the railway line for Glenbrook Station, then named Wascoe Siding. Today is serves as spot for hobbyists and historians for miniature trains.

It is located on Grahame St (see map detail above), open to visitors on the 1st Sunday each month (10am to 4pm).

Scouts Club 
It is also the home of the 1st Blaxland Scout group

Gallery

References

External links
 Blaxland History
 Blaxland High School
 Blaxland Football Club

1830 establishments in Australia
Communities in the Blue Mountains (New South Wales)
Populated places established in 1830